Patiala district is one of the twenty three districts in the state of Punjab in north-west India.

Patiala district lies between 38 47’ and 39 41’ north latitude, 115 58’ and 116 54' east longitude, in the southeast part of the state. It is surrounded by Fatehgarh Sahib, Rupnagar and Mohali to the north, Fatehgarh Sahib and Sangrur districts to the west, Ambala, Panchkula, Haryana to the northeast and Kurukshetra districts of neighboring Haryana state to the east, and Kaithal district of Haryana to the southwest.

Baba Ala Singh (1691–1765), a Sikh chieftain from the village Rampura Phul in Bathinda District of Punjab, with his army of young brave men migrated to Barnala where Baba Ala Singh in 1763 set up his new state. Later Baba Ala Singh moved to a small village of Lehal where he built a new city on the village, naming it as Patiala. He laid the foundations of a steady and stable state known as the Phulkian Dynasty south of Sirhind. In and around Patiala District he founded many villages within his territory, and reconstructed many historical Gurdwaras relating to Sikh religion.

It was since Baba Ala Singh's time that Patiala District came into being as before the area was under the Sirhind Government. Baba Ala Singh made Sirhind, Tohana, Mansa, Bathinda, Sangrur and Barnala, Fatehabad District part of Patiala State.

In 1809, Patiala State came under British protection during the reign of Maharaja Sahib Singh (1773–1813) of Phulkian Dynasty, as he feared that Maharaja Ranjit Singh of Lahore would cross the Sutlej river and take the district and state so the Patiala rulers got the British to protect them from further invasion from 1809 to 1947 Patiala remained under British Protection. In 1948 Patiala Princely State was abolished by the Indian government.

Patiala District was further divided into Fatehgarh Sahib District on 13 April 1992.

Patiala having a population of 1,895,686 is the 4th most populated district of Punjab after Ludhiana, Amritsar, and Jalandhar as per the 2011 census.

Geography
This district contains many small hill ranges that are part of the Shivalik Hills.

Divisions
The district is divided into three sub-divisions: Patiala, Rajpura and Nabha, which are further divided into five tehsils: Patiala, Rajpura, Nabha, Samana and Pattran. It also comprises eight blocks, Patiala, Rajpura, Nabha and Samana.

There are nine Punjab Vidhan Sabha constituencies located in this district: Patiala Urban, Patiala Rural, Rajpura, Nabha, Samana, Ghanaur, Shutrana, Sanaur, and Patran. All of these are part of Patiala Lok Sabha constituency.

Industry
Patiala is fast emerging as an important industrial growth center on the industrial map of the state. Besides traditional goods, high quality and sophisticated items are now produced including small cutting tools, power cables, Vanaspati ghee, bicycles, and agriculture implements including harvester combines and threshers, milk products, and pesticides. The industrial units are scattered all over the district mainly at Rajpura, Patiala, Samana, and Nabha. There are large and medium industrial units located at Rajpura producing Vanaspati ghee, power cables, bicycles, and bicycle components and at Dera Bassi producing spun-yarn and alcohol. Among the small scale industry in the district are those producing agriculture implements, rice shellers, cutting tools, electrical goods, and bakeries. There are industrial focal points at Patiala, Rajpura, Nabha, and Dera Bassi and two industrial estates at Rajpura, Patiala.

Demographics

According to the 2011 census, Patiala district has a population of 1,895,686, roughly equal to the nation of Slovenia or the US state of Mississippi. This gives it a ranking of 248th in India (out of a total of 640). Its population growth rate over the decade 2001-2011 was 19.4%. Patiala has a sex ratio of 888 females for every 1000 males, and a literacy rate of 76.3%. Scheduled Castes made up 24.55% of the population.

Religion

Language

At the time of the 2011 census, 89.61% of the population spoke Punjabi, 7.79% Hindi and 1.24% Bahawalpuri as their first language.

Topography

Most of the area is plains in the form of agricultural land. The river Ghaghar remains dry during most part of the year. However, during the rainy season, it often causes flooding in the adjoining villages, which results in damage to the crops, livestock, and human lives. Other subsidiary rivers are Tangri Nadi, Patiala-Wali-Nadi, Sirhind Choe, and the Jhambowali Choe.

Apart from the natural water lines, the Bhakra Main Line canal, the Nawana Branch, and the Ghaghar Link are the most important. These canals are the backbone of the irrigation system of the district.

Politics

References

External links
 

 

 
Districts of Punjab, India